William Júnior Salles de Lima Souza (born 14 May 1983), simply known as William, is a Brazilian footballer who plays as a striker.

Career
His previous clubs include Santos, Ulsan Hyundai and Busan IPark in South Korea.

Honours
Santos
Campeonato Brasileiro Série A: 2004

Grêmio
Campeonato Gaúcho: 2010

Ceará
Copa do Nordeste: 2015

References

External links

1983 births
Brazilian footballers
Brazilian expatriate footballers
Brazil international footballers
Association football forwards
Living people
Pan American Games medalists in football
Pan American Games silver medalists for Brazil
Footballers at the 2003 Pan American Games
Santos FC players
Ulsan Hyundai FC players
Boavista F.C. players
Coritiba Foot Ball Club players
En Avant Guingamp players
Avaí FC players
Grêmio Foot-Ball Porto Alegrense players
Associação Atlética Ponte Preta players
Atlético Clube Goianiense players
Esporte Clube Vitória players
Al-Khor SC players
Ceará Sporting Club players
Busan IPark players
Esporte Clube Água Santa players
Clube Náutico Capibaribe players
Associação Portuguesa de Desportos players
Rio Branco Sport Club players
Campeonato Brasileiro Série A players
Campeonato Brasileiro Série B players
K League 1 players
Primeira Liga players
Ligue 2 players
Qatar Stars League players
People from Rolândia
Expatriate footballers in South Korea
Expatriate footballers in Portugal
Expatriate footballers in France
Expatriate footballers in Qatar
Brazilian expatriate sportspeople in South Korea
Brazilian expatriate sportspeople in Portugal
Brazilian expatriate sportspeople in France
Brazilian expatriate sportspeople in Qatar
Medalists at the 2003 Pan American Games
Sportspeople from Paraná (state)